Bernard Généreux  (born April 23, 1962) is a Canadian politician who was elected to represent the electoral district of Montmagny—L'Islet—Kamouraska—Rivière-du-Loup in the House of Commons in the federal by-elections on November 9, 2009. He is a member of the Conservative Party.

Prior to his election, Généreux served as Mayor of La Pocatière. He was initially declared reelected in his riding in the 2011 election, but it was announced on May 5, 2011, that verification of the polling station tallies had given the riding to his New Democratic Party opponent François Lapointe by just five votes, after 110 votes for Lapointe were reportedly allocated in error to the Green Party candidate on election night. Following a judicial recount, Lapointe was declared elected. Généreux was again a candidate for the 2015 election, where he won with over 200 votes. He was re-elected in the 2019 federal election.

Electoral record

References

External links

1962 births
Conservative Party of Canada MPs
French Quebecers
Living people
Mayors of places in Quebec
Members of the House of Commons of Canada from Quebec
People from Bas-Saint-Laurent
Université Laval alumni
21st-century Canadian politicians
People from Chaudière-Appalaches